Spinete is a comune (municipality) in the Province of Campobasso in the Italian region Molise, located about  west of Campobasso.

Spinete borders the following municipalities: Baranello, Bojano, Busso, Casalciprano, Colle d'Anchise, Sant'Elena Sannita.

Friend towns
 Medicina, Italy

References

Cities and towns in Molise